A splenic injury, which includes a ruptured spleen, is any injury to the spleen. The rupture of a normal spleen can be caused by trauma, such as a traffic collision.

Signs and symptoms
In minor injuries with little bleeding, there may be abdominal pain, tenderness in the epigastrium and pain in the left flank. Often there is a sharp pain in the left shoulder, known as Kehr's sign. In larger injuries with more extensive bleeding, signs of hypovolemic shock are most prominent. This might include a rapid pulse, low blood pressure, rapid breathing, paleness, and anxiety.

Causes
The most common cause of a ruptured spleen is blunt abdominal trauma, such as in traffic collisions or sports accidents. Direct, penetrating injuries, for example, stab or gunshot wounds are rare.

Non-traumatic causes are less common. These include infectious diseases, medical procedures such as colonoscopy, haematological diseases, medications, and pregnancy.

In less than one percent of cases of infectious mononucleosis splenic rupture may occur.

Diagnosis

Splenic rupture is usually evaluated by FAST ultrasound of the abdomen. Generally this is not specific to splenic injury; however, it is useful to determine the presence of free floating blood in the peritoneum. A diagnostic peritoneal lavage, while not ideal, may be used to evaluate the presence of internal bleeding a person who is hemodynamically unstable.  The FAST exam typically serves to evaluate the need to perform a CT scan. Computed tomography with IV contrast is the preferred imaging study as it can provide high quality images of the full peritoneal cavity.

Organ injury scale
American Association for the Surgery of Trauma Organ Injury Scaling: Splenic Injury Grading

Treatment
Because a splenic rupture permits large amounts of blood to leak into the abdominal cavity, it can result in shock and death. Generally a nonoperative approach is chosen in those who are hemodynamically stable with non-worsening symptoms. During this period of nonoperative management strict bed rest between 24 and 72 hours with careful monitoring along with a CT 7 days after the injury.

Splenic artery embolization is a minimally invasive procedure and, where successful, avoids splenectomy.  

If an individual's spleen is enlarged, as is frequent in mononucleosis, most physicians will advise against activities (such as contact sports) where injury to the abdomen could be catastrophic.

Patients whose spleens have been removed via a splenectomy must receive immunizations to help prevent infections such as pneumonia. This helps to replace the lost function of this organ.

See also
 Splenomegaly
 Kehr's sign
 Ballance's sign

References

Bibliography

External links 

Injuries of abdomen, lower back, lumbar spine and pelvis
Spleen (anatomy)